KC2XAK was the world's first UHF television station, which went on the air on December 29, 1949. It was a broadcast translator of New York City's WNBT (today's WNBC), and broadcast on 529–535 MHz in Bridgeport, Connecticut.

The station's launch was code-named "Operation Bridgeport", as a test by RCA and NBC, to determine if the UHF spectrum was feasible to use for communications and broadcasting as part of a nationwide television station plan. It was operational during a several-year freeze on new television stations by the FCC which lasted from October 1948 to April 1952.

This resulted in an effective radiated power of 10 kW.

Operation Bridgeport was a success in the sense that it demonstrated the viability of UHF broadcasting, and UHF became a major part of the FCC's plan for new television licensing in the early 1950s. KC2XAK was shut down by RCA and NBC on August 23, 1952, a few months after the 1948 freeze on new television licenses was lifted. KC2XAK thus was not only the first UHF television station operational in the United States, but the only one for several years.

Once KC2XAK's transmitter was shut down, Empire Coil purchased it, and the transmitter and support equipment were dismantled in Bridgeport under supervision of RCA. Dismantling began on August 25 and was shipped via truck and fast freight train to Portland, Oregon. Thus, KC2XAK's transmitter was re-used for Portland's KPTV, which became the first commercial full-power UHF television station in the country. KPTV would utilize the transmitter for five years on channel 27, before merging with another broadcaster on VHF channel 12 in 1957, where it has broadcast since (though the station is scheduled to return its physical transmission to UHF some time in 2022).

Bridgeport is now covered over-the-air by WNBC and the other New York City broadcast stations.

See also
 Early television stations
 History of television
 List of experimental television stations
 Narrow-bandwidth television
 Oldest television station
 Television systems before 1940

References

External links
 KC2XAK on gginfo.com

Mass media in Bridgeport, Connecticut
History of television
Experimental television stations
Television stations in Connecticut
History of Bridgeport, Connecticut
Television channels and stations established in 1949
Television channels and stations disestablished in 1952
1949 establishments in Connecticut
1952 disestablishments in Connecticut
Defunct mass media in Connecticut
Defunct television stations in the United States